Datolite is a calcium boron hydroxide nesosilicate, CaBSiO4(OH). It was first observed by Jens Esmark in 1806, and named by him from δατεῖσθαι, "to divide," and  λίθος, "stone," in allusion to the granular structure
of the massive mineral.

Datolite crystallizes in the monoclinic system forming prismatic crystals and nodular masses. The luster is vitreous and may be brown, yellow, light green or colorless. The Mohs hardness is 5.5 and the specific gravity is 2.8 - 3.0. 

The type localities are in the diabases of the Connecticut River valley and Arendal, Aust-Agder, Norway. Associated minerals include prehnite, danburite, babingtonite, epidote, native copper, calcite, quartz and zeolites. It is common in the copper deposits of the Lake Superior region of Michigan. It occurs as a secondary mineral in mafic igneous rocks often filling vesicles along with zeolites in basalt. Unlike most localities throughout the world, the occurrence of datolite in the Lake Superior region is usually fine grained in texture and possesses colored banding. Much of the coloration is due to the inclusion of copper or associated minerals in progressive stages of hydrothermal precipitation.

Botryolite is a botryoidal form of datolite.

References

External links

Mineral galleries

Calcium minerals
Nesosilicates
Gemstones
Monoclinic minerals
Minerals in space group 14
Luminescent minerals